Unkind Ladies is a 2015 South Korean television series starring Kim Hye-ja, Chae Shi-ra, Do Ji-won and Lee Ha-na. It aired on KBS2 from February 25 to May 14, 2015 on Wednesdays and Thursdays at 21:55 for 24 episodes.

Plot
Three generations of a family of women are led by matriarch Kang Soon-ok, a famous cooking instructor to the rich and famous. Her older daughter Kim Hyun-jung is a rising network anchor at a television station, while younger daughter Kim Hyun-sook is the black sheep of the family. Jung Ma-ri is Hyun-sook's daughter but takes after her aunt by being accomplished, and is on track to become the youngest professor at the university where she works. Ma-ri gets caught up in a love triangle between a pair of half-brothers, reporter Lee Doo-jin and kendo instructor Lee Roo-oh.

Cast

Main characters
Kim Hye-ja as Kang Soon-ok
Lee Hang-na as 37-year-old Soon-ok
Chae Shi-ra as Kim Hyun-sook
Ha Seung-ri as young Hyun-sook
Do Ji-won as Kim Hyun-jung
Im Ju-yeon as young Hyun-jung
Lee Ha-na as Jung Ma-ri

Supporting characters
Jang Mi-hee as Jang Mo-ran
Ha Ji-eun as young Mo-ran
Lee Soon-jae as Kim Chul-hee/Yang Mi-nam
Kim Hyun-goon as young Chul-hee
Lee Mi-do as Park Eun-shil
Park Hyuk-kwon as Jung Goo-min
 Yoon Jong-hoon as young Goo-min
Seo Yi-sook as Na Hyun-ae/Na Mal-nyeon
Kim Hye-eun as Ahn Jong-mi
Kim Min-young as young Jong-mi
Son Chang-min as Lee Moon-hak
Yoo Se-hyung as Yoo Se-hyeong	
Song Jae-rim as Lee Roo-oh
Kim Ji-seok as Lee Doo-jin
Choi Jung-woo as Han Choong-gil
Jung Ji-soon as Sun Dong-tae
Song Young-gyu as Lee Moon-soo (flashback)
Park Ji-a as Vocalist	
Chae Sang-woo as Gook Young-soo
Kim Min-young as Ahn Jong-mi	
Ji Yi-soo as Jae-kyung
Ham Sung-min as Student
Oh Hee-joon as Instructor Kim	
Jang Kyung-ae as Mari's friend
Lee Seung-hyun as Na Boo-gil
Kwon Il-soo as martial artist extra

Cameos
Jang Gwang as traditional fortune-teller (episode 1)
Joo Jong-hyuk as Ma-ri's student (episode 1)
Julian Quintart as Leif Garrett (flashbacks)
Lee Sang-yoon as top star (episode 3)
Boyfriend as popular idol group (episode 5)
Jo Young-min as Idol group member (episode 5)
Jo Kwang-min as Idol group member (episode 5)
Kim Dong-hyun as Idol group member (episode 5)
Park Chil-yong as jewelry appraiser (Ahn Jong-mi's uncle; episode 6)
Choi Jong-hoon & Choi Ha-na as adulterous couple (episode 8)
Lee Seung-yeon  as junior anchorwoman (episode 8)
An Si Wu as presentator on the train (episode 15)
Lee Su Han as helper of presentator on the train (episode 15)
Lee Yong Seong as helper of presentator on the train (episode 15) 
Lee Sang-joon as pianist (episode 19)
Lee Deok-hwa as Han Ki-young, Mo-ran's ex-fiancé (episodes 21-22)

Ratings

Awards and nominations

References

External links
  
 
 

2015 South Korean television series debuts
Korean Broadcasting System television dramas
2015 South Korean television series endings
South Korean romance television series
Television series by IOK Media